The Monastery of the Holy Spirit, officially the Monastery of Our Lady of the Holy Spirit, is a Trappist monastery located near Conyers, Georgia, in the United States.

As of 2022, the monastery is home to a community of twenty-eight monks spanning several generations who live, work, and pray at the abbey. They were founded in the Abbey of Our Lady of Gethsemani in Kentucky in the spring of 1944. The monks in Georgia are now self-sustaining, running businesses on site.

The monastery and grounds are a part of the Arabia Mountain National Heritage Area and also serves as the southernmost point on the Arabia Mountain Path.

History

Monastery of the Holy Spirit was founded on March 21, 1944, by twenty monks from the Abbey of Gethsemani. On  of land donated by the Archdiocese of Atlanta and silent film star Colleen Moore, these first monks lived in a barn while they built (by themselves) what would become known as the "pine board" monastery. They then lived in this monastery from December 1944 -1959 while they hand-built the present Monastery, a concrete structure complete with a retreat house and cloister. In 2005, the pine board monastery which housed their carpentry and stained glass businesses was destroyed in a fire.

Some previous abbots have been Augustine Moore, Armand Veilleux, Bernard Johnson, Basil Pennington, and Francis Michael Stiteler. The present abbot is Augustine Myslinski who received the abbatial blessing on August 15, 2016, the solemnity of the Assumption of the Blessed Virgin Mary.

Prayer, confession and spiritual direction
The primary work of the monks at the Monastery of the Holy Spirit is prayer. The monks begin their day of prayer at 4 A.M. with vigils and a half hour of contemplation. They break at about 5:30 and return at 7 A.M. for Mass. Throughout their day of work in their businesses and chores, the monks break for prayer at midmorning, midday (12:15), evening (vespers at 5:20) and compline (night prayer at 7:30). Grand silence for both monks and guests is required after 8 P.M. Retreat house guests are encouraged to pray with the monks in the church.

At least half of the monks at the Monastery of the Holy Spirit are priests who rotate in administering the Sacrament of Penance (Confession) at the retreat house. Monks are also available for spiritual direction and welcome people of all faiths, including those of no faith.

Retreats

The monks operate a self-sustaining retreat for people who wish to seek a religious retreat. On the premises and adjoining the church is their dormitory-style retreat house where separate floors for men and women accommodate individual and groups of guests for retreats scheduled almost year-round. Classes and retreats are offered on religious topics, and food is served to the guests.

Lay associates

The Lay Associate movement began with a small group of people associated with the Monastery of the Holy Spirit and led by Fr. Anthony Delisi, former abbot and current prior. These groups are composed of lay people who form a prayerful community that forms its members in Cistercian spiritualty. These groups make annual retreats to the Monastery. The Monastery of the Holy Spirit is now motherhouse to five different groups of Lay Cistercians. There are Lay Cistercians worldwide who are affiliated with monasteries near their groups.

Monastery businesses

The monks of Holy Spirit follow the Rule of St. Benedict,   precept of self-sustainment by operating several businesses. These include a bonsai garden store and an online store for bonsai supplies as well as stained glass production and sales through an online store. They also operate a green cemetery located on the monastery property. In addition, the monks produce fruitcakes and fudge which are sold through their religious store and through Honey Baked Ham stores.

Visitor Center

New visitor center
The monastery began construction in January 2010 on a new public gathering place and Visitor Center, which was built in the barn where the monks first lived when they began the monastery. The Visitor Center features a museum that showcases the history and work of the monastery. It was opened to the public in May 2011.

Additional images

See also
Cistercians
Catholic Church
Rule of Benedict

References

Portraits of Grace: Images and Words from the Monastery of the Holy Spirit by James Stephen Behrens, OCSO

External links

Holy Spirit Monastery's website (trappist.net)
Holy Spirit Monastery online Garden Center
Holy Spirit Monastery Gifts
PATH Trail Map at Monastery of the Holy Spirit

Christian organizations established in 1944
Trappist monasteries in the United States
Catholic Church in Georgia (U.S. state)
Buildings and structures in Rockdale County, Georgia
Tourist attractions in Rockdale County, Georgia